Kamal Haasan is an Indian actor, who works mainly in the Tamil film industry. He is widely regarded as one of the greatest actors in history of Indian cinema, he received the President's Gold Medal at the age of six for acting in his debut film Kalathur Kannamma. As of 2013, Haasan has won four National Film Awards, two Filmfare Awards and a record 17 Filmfare Awards South. After his last Filmfare award for Hey Ram in 2000, he wrote to the organisation requesting not to award him further. Haasan received his first National Film Award for Best Actor in 1983 for Moondram Pirai in which he played the role of a school teacher who looks after a girl suffering from amnesia. In 1988 he secured his second National Film Award for Best Actor for his performance in Mani Ratnam's Nayakan, which was ranked by Time magazine as one of the "Top-100 best films" of all time. In 1997, Haasan received his third National Film Award for Best Actor in Indian, in which he portrayed the role of a freedom fighter who tries to drive out corruption from the country.

Seven of the films that Haasan has been featured were submitted by India to the Academy Awards for Best Foreign Language Film, the most films ever submitted for any actor in India. Apart from his acting career he has also worked as a director, screenwriter, playback singer and lyricist. He owns a film production company, Raaj Kamal Films International, named after his mother, which produces several of his films. In 2009, he became one of the few actors in India to have completed 50 years in Indian cinema. 2013 CNN-IBN survey on "100 years of Indian cinema kamal in 2nd position of greatest indian actors of all time.

Haasan has been honoured at a few International film festivals. Films like Hey Ram and Virumaandi, both directed by him were screened at several film festivals. Hey Ram was showcased under the category "Director in Focus" at the Rotterdam Film Festival and Virumaandi was awarded the Best Film at the Puchon International Fantastic Film Festival.

Civilian honours
Kamal Haasan has been a recipient of Padma Shri and Padma Bhushan, the fourth and third highest civilian honours awarded by the Government of India respectively.

Industry, Media and Government Recognition

CNN IBN

The CNN IBN television network honoured Haasan with the title "Indian of the Year" in 2010 for completing 50 years in the film industry.

FICCI Living Legend
The Federation of Indian Chambers of Commerce and Industry (FICCI) funds and supports many governmental and non-governmental educational institutions across the country.

Government Awards
The Government of Tamil Nadu honoured Haasan with the Kalaimamani in 1980 for his contribution to the Tamil film industry. In 2010 Haasan was honoured by the Government of Kerala upon his completion of 50 years in Indian cinema. In 2000 March 7, Kamal Haasan was honoured by the Government of West Bengal upon his film Hey Ram screened at Netaji Indoor Stadium, West Bengal.

Honorary Doctorate 
In 2005, Sathyabama Deemed University awarded Haasan an honorary doctorate. In 2019, Centurion University awarded Haasan an honorary doctorate, Special Guest Odisha chief minister Naveen Patnaik gave award to Kamal haasan.

Other honours

Income Tax Department
Kamal Haasan was honoured by the Income Tax Department for being a shining example of good citizenship by paying taxes his taxes on a regular basis.

Abraham Kovoor National Award
Kamal Haasan was awarded the Abraham Kovoor National Award by the Bharatheeya Yukthivadi Sangham for his Philanthropic activities.

SOMAN LIFETIME ACHIEVEMENT AWARD
Kamal Haasan was awarded the Soman Lifetime achievement Award by the M.G. Soman Foundation for his Cinema and Philanthropic activities.

Whistling Woods International
Kamal haasan was honoured with the prestigious MAESTRO AWARD by Whistling Woods International (WWI), on 18 July 2014.

Prix Henri-Langlois French Award
Kamal haasan was honoured with the prestigious Prix Henri-Langlois French Award on 30 March 2016.

Tamil Chamber of Commerce
On 2 August 2014, actor Kamal Haasan was presented with Lifetime Achievement Award by Chief guest Governor Dr. K. Rosaiah at a function organised by Tamil Chamber of Commerce as part of its 70th anniversary celebrations.

Hindustan Times
Kamal Haasan was presented with Hall of Fame award by Hindustan Times at HT India's Most Stylish Awards 2013.

Puthiya Thalaimurai TV
Kamal Haasan was presented with Lifetime Achievement Award by Puthiya Thalaimurai TV at Puthiya Thalaimurai Tamizhan Award function in 2013.

Outlook Social Media Awards
Kamal Haasan was presented with Man of the year 2018 by Outlook Social Media Groups.

Viswa Kala Bharathi Award 
Kamal Haasan was presented with Viswa Kala Bharathi Excellence Dance in Tamil Cinama 2009 by Bharat Kalachar, Chennai.

Eenam Swaralaya Awards 
Kamal Haasan was presented with Eenam Swaralaya Bharat Murali Award in 2016 by Eenam Swaralaya International Cultural Organization, Kerala.

Behindwoods Gold Medals Award 
Behindwoods hosted the second Behindwoods Gold Medals award ceremony on 19 July at Hotel ITC Grand Chola in Chennai and to dedicate 'K.Balachander Gold Medal for Excellence in Indian Cinema' to the Legendary Kamal Haasan.

Mirchi Music Awards 
Kamal Haasan receives Outstanding contribution to Music award at Mirchi Music Awards South 2014.

Galatta Nakshatra Awards 
Kamal Haasan receives Game Changer of the Year 2018 award.

Original Pan India Star Award 
Kamal Haasan receives Original Pan India Star Award in SIIMA Awards 2022.

Most Talented Hero Award (Since 1991 - 2005) 
Kamal Haasan receives Most Talented Hero Award, India Today - Conducted Open Public Survey about Tamil Film Industries (1991-2005) at 2006 .

BIG FM Tamil Entertainment Awards 
Kamal Haasan was presented with Best Entertaining Bharatanatyam Dancer 2011 by BIG FM.

Contemporary Living Legend of Year 2007 Award

A Mumbai based UFO Digital Cinema Company has selected Kamal haasan for the Contemporary Living Legend of Year 2007 award.

Rashtrabhushan Award
Kamal Haasan was presented with Rashtrabhushan Award by FIE Foundation.

The FIE Foundation is a charity trust (NGO) established in 1970, belongs to 'Fie Group of Industries' Ichalkaranji, in Maharashtra State of India. The awards are generally selected form the following fields,- Engineering , Science & Technology , Humanities, Education, Agriculture, Music & Arts, Sports, Literature, Child Artist and Local talents. The highest award conferred is 'Rashtrabhushan Awards'. The awards are given every year in a grand ceremony held in Ichalkaranji in January/February at the hands of eminent dignitaries.

Rotary Club of Madras Award 
Kamal Haasan was presented with Lifetime Achievement Award by Rotary Club of Madras.

Shifa Al Jazeera Excellence Award 
Kamal Haasan was presented with Shifa Al Jazeera Excellence Award by Shifa Al Jazeera Medical Group, Bahrain.

India Retail Excellence Awards 
Kamal Haasan was presented with RAI Award at India Retail Excellence Awards, 2019 by Retailers Association of India.

ATMA National Award (Tobacco Awareness)
Kamal Haasan was presented with ATMA Award by Amrita Hospitals & Medical Group, India.

Asian Television Award
Haasan was nominated in Best Entertainment Presenter / Host award at 2019 Asian Television Awards.

Film Awards

Ananda Vikatan Cinema Awards
Recently honoured with S. S. Vasan Award for his lifetime achievement in film industry by Ananda Vikatan.

Asianet Film Awards
The Asianet Film Awards are presented by Asianet, a Malayalam language television channel in the Indian state of Kerala. The award ceremony has been held annually since 1998.

BFJA Awards
The Bengal Film Journalists' Association Awards are presented to Kamal Haasan, Most Outstanding Work of the Year award for Hey Ram film. The 64th Annual Bengal Film Journalists' Association (BFJA) Awards commenced on 21 July 2001.

Cinema Express Awards
The Cinema Express Awards are presented annually by The New Indian Express Group on behalf of Cinema Express film magazine to honour artistic excellence of professionals in the south Indian film industries. The awards were introduced in 1981.

Film Fans Association Award

Filmfare Awards
The Filmfare Awards are presented by The Times Group to honour artistic as well as technical skills of artists in the Hindi film industry of India. The award was established in 1954. Haasan has been awarded twice out of six nominations.

Filmfare Awards South
The Filmfare Awards South is a part of Filmfare Awards, which is given to the South Indian film industry, that consists of the Tamil, Telugu, Malayalam and Kannada film industries. Hasan has won the best actor award 17 times out of 33 nominations. Haasan is the only actor awarded the most number of times and across all languages.

Nandi Awards
The Nandi Awards are presented by the Government of Andhra Pradesh for honouring artistic skills in Telugu cinema. Haasan won the award three times, all during the 1980s. He also won the NTR National Award in 2014.

National Film Awards
The National Film Awards, established in 1954, are the most prominent awards for films in India, administered by the Directorate of Film Festivals since 1973.

Rashtrapathi Awards
The Rashtrapati Awards are given by the President of India for achievements made in the field of Sports, Arts, Military, Literature, Cinema, Culture, Science and Technology.

SICA Awards
South Indian Cinematographers Association (SICA) Awards

SIIMA Awards
South Indian International Movie Awards

Star Screen Awards
The Screen Awards were introduced by the Screen magazine in 1994 to honour artists and technicians of the Hindi film industry for artistic talents and technical excellence.

French Film Society Award
France's film society called as 'Film France' is to honour some of the exceptional works of South Indian Film Industry.

Tamil Nadu State Film Awards
The Tamil Nadu State Film Awards are the most important awards given for Tamil films. They are given annually by the Government of Tamil Nadu. The winners are selected by a jury headed by a chairman. Haasan is a nine-time winner of the awards, out of which eight come under the "Best Actor" category.

Vijay Awards
The Vijay Awards are presented by STAR Vijay, a Tamil television channel to honour artists in Tamil cinema. The awards were established in 2006. Haasan is the most frequent winner to date.

V. Shantaram Awards
The V. Shantaram Award was instituted by the Government of Maharashtra and named after V. Shantaram, a filmmaker from India. The awards honour films at the national level given by (Rajkamal Academy of Cinematic Excellence). Haasan has won 4 awards out of 5 nominations.

Zee Cine Awards
The Zee Cine Awards, instituted by the Zee Network honours artists of the Hindi film industry.

MGR-Sivaji Academy Award
The MGR-Sivaji Academy Awards, organized by the Tamil Thiraipada Pathirikai Thozhilalar Union (TTPTU) honours artists of the Tamil film industry.

International Film Festival Awards

International Film Festival of Los Angeles Independent Film Festival

Puchon International Fantastic Film Festival (South Korea)

International Film Festival Rotterdam

Mumbai International Film Festival

Norway Tamil Film Festival Awards 
Kamal Haasan was presented with Lifetime Achievement Award by NTFF (Norway Tamil Film Festival).

London Indian Film Festival 
Kamal Haasan was presented with Lifetime Achievement Award at Liff (London Indian Film Festival) by BAGRI Foundation.

New York Festivals International Film & TV Awards 
Mr. Haasan will receive an award on behalf of the Indian cinema presented by Chris Brown, Executive Vice President, Conventions & Business Operations for the National Association of Broadcasters. The ceremony is part of the New York Festivals International Film & TV awards.

Jagran Film Festival 
Kamal Haasan was presented with Special Jury Award 4th Jagran Film Festival, India.

Other Recognitions 

 Kamal Haasan, who is a United Nations ambassador for HIV/AIDS, has actively campaigned for the Tamil Nadu AIDS Control Society as well.
 2013 Limca Book of Records – "People of the year Award"
 2017 India Today – "Most Powerful Indian".
 2013 Forbes India included his 1994 role in Mahanadi as one of the "25 Greatest Acting Performances of Indian Cinema".
 2013 CNN-IBN survey on "100 years of Indian cinema" – 2nd position as India's Great Actors. (First-NTR 54 percentage, Kamal-49 percentage)
 Haasan was honoured in India House at London in UK-India Year of Culture 2017.
 Haasan was honoured in Grand Marshal in 38th India Day Parade at Manhattan, New York in 2018.
 2013 News18 has released The 100 greatest Indian films of all time of 100 Years of Indian Cinema. It featured 7 films starring Kamal Haasan.
 A Kamal Haasan Film Festival was held on his 50th Film Career Anniversary held on Ministry of Information and Broadcasting at Surifort Auditorium II, India on 10 July 2010.
 The 67th Cannes Film Festival, which was held from 14 May 2014, comprised a showcase Indian cinema across linguistic, cultural and regional diversity, with the aim of forging international partnerships in the realms of distribution, production, filming in India, script development and technology, and promoting film sales and syndication", according to an official press note.
 In 2005, the magazine TIME included Nayakan in its list of "All-Time 100 Best Films". The film was also included in The Moving Arts Film Journal list of greatest films of all time. Nayakan was also included in NDTV's list "India's 20 greatest films". News18 and CNN-IBN included the film in its list of "100 greatest Indian films of all time".
 10th edition of the India Habitat Film Festival in 2015 year were retrospective showcase Kamal Haasan's films "Ek Duje Ke Liye", "Sadma", "Chachi 420" , "Saagar", "Hey Ram", "Guna", "Virumandi" at the Convention Centre foyer in collaboration with the National Film Archive of India, Pune.
 2003 – Actor Kamal Haasan had been selected as the 'Guest of Honour' for the 34th International Film Festival of India, 9 October, Delhi.
 2013 – He inaugurated the 6th Bengaluru International Film Festival of India in Karnataka.
 2013 – He inaugurated the 11th Chennai International Film Festival of India in Tamil Nadu.
 2013– He inaugurated the 19th Kolkata International Film Festival (KIFF).
 2013 – He inaugurated the 44th International Film Festival of India, Goa.
 2007– He inaugurated the 12th International Film Festival of Kerala.
 2016– He was invited 'Chief Guest Speaker' Wharton India Economic Forum (WIEF), Philadelphia, 20th Edition of the Conference, 26 March 2016.
 Actor-filmmaker Kamal Haasan, in association with the All India Film Employees Confederation (AIFEC), had organised a three-day film workshop in November, 2015 for over 10,000 people working in the industry.
 He is one of the board member of Censor Board of Film Certification.
 Kamal Haasan, in association with the Indian Institute of Technology- Madras (IIT-M) presented a first-of-its-kind International Workshop and Seminar on Screenwriting in the IIT campus in Chennai from 29 May to 3 June 2009.

See also 
 Kamal Haasan filmography
 Kamal Haasan discography

Notes

References

External links 
Awards for Kamal Haasan. Internet Movie Database

Lists of awards received by Indian actor
Awards